Orchesography is the seventh studio album by English new wave band Wang Chung. It consists of the band's greatest hits re-recorded with the City of Prague Philharmonic Orchestra.

After producing the orchestral albums Orchestral for Visage and Ascension for A Flock of Seagulls, record label August Day decided to continue on the orchestral route by approaching fellow 80s band Wang Chung. Orchesography was released on 31 May 2019 on both CD and digital download formats. On 26 March, a 5-track EP was released for the song "Dance Hall Days"  which features the band's re-recording with the orchestra, three remixes from other artists, and one "orcapella" (an orchestral a cappella). A music video was also recorded.

On 10 May, a limited edition box set was released that included four CDs: the main Orchesography album, a vocal and orchestral only CD, a CD containing only the orchestra, and a CD containing non-orchestral remixes of the album tracks. Also included are two CD singles: a 5-track EP of "Dance Hall Days" and an 8-track "Everybody Have Fun Tonight".

Track listing

Personnel 

Musicians
 Jack Hues - lead vocals, guitar
 Nick Feldman - vocals, bass
 Jan Chalupecky - orchestra conductor
 Lucie Svehlova - concert master
 Allan Ryder - saxophone on "Dance Hall Days"
 Baby N'Sola, John Bryan - additional vocals

Technical and additional personnel
 John Bryan, Sare Havlicek, Wang Chung - producers
 Slava Voroshnin - programming
 Sare Havlicek - synth and sampler programming
 Sare Havlicek - mixing
 Adam Wren - additional engineering
 Ray Staff - mastering
 Vitek Kral - orchestra recording engineer
 James Fitzpatrick - orchestra supervisor
 Pete Whitfield, Nick Feldman, Jack Hues, John Bryan, Sare Havlicek - orchestral arrangements
 Christy Lee Rogers - cover
 Vinny Vero - Wang Chung logo

References 

Orchesography
Orchesography
August Day Recordings albums
City of Prague Philharmonic Orchestra albums